The men's 110 metres hurdles at the 2012 African Championships in Athletics was held at the Stade Charles de Gaulle on 29 and 30 June.

Medalists

Records

Schedule

Results

Round 1
First 3 in each heat (Q) and 2 best performers (q) advance to the Final.

Wind:Heat 1: -0.8 m/s, Heat 2: -1.6 m/s

Final
Wind: -1.1 m/s

References

Results

Hurdles 110 Men
Sprint hurdles at the African Championships in Athletics